Orobol is one of several known isoflavones. It can be isolated from Aspergillus niger or Streptomyces neyagawaensis. It is a potent inhibitor of Phosphoinositide 3-kinase.

References 

Isoflavones